Eiður Svanberg Guðnason (7 November 1939 – 30 January 2017) was an Icelandic politician and diplomat.

Biography
Eiður was born on 7 November 1939 in Reykjavík. He served as Ambassador of Iceland to Australia from 28 November 2003 when he replaced Ólafur Egilsson. He served until 22 February 2007, when he was replaced with Gunnar Snorri Gunnarsson.

Eiður died on 30 January 2017 in Garðabær at the age of 77.

References

External links 
 Biography of Eiður Svanberg Guðnason on the website of the Icelandic parliament

|-

1939 births
2017 deaths
Eidur Svanberg Gudnason
Ambassadors of Iceland to South Korea
Ambassadors of Iceland to Australia
Ambassadors of Iceland to Vietnam